Ansan is a mountain in the county of Inje, Gangwon-do in South Korea. It is in the north-western area of Seoraksan National Park.

See also
 List of mountains in Korea

Notes

References

External links
 Official site by National Geographic Information Institute for searching South Korean sites and landscapes by name (in Korean)

Mountains of Gangwon Province, South Korea
Inje County
Mountains of South Korea